Hans Krumpper (c.1570 – between 7 and 14 May 1634) was a German sculptor, plasterer, architect, and intendant of the arts who served the Bavarian dukes William V and Maximilian I.

Krumpper was born in Weilheim in Oberbayern.  He worked for the Bavarian court from 1584, and in 1599 he succeeded Friedrich Sustris; in 1609 he became the chief sculptor to the court.
He was strongly influenced by the Italian and Dutch mannerism and became the creator of the first self-contained Bavarian Early Baroque sculptures.  He died in Munich.

Among his masterpieces are the Old Residence in Munich and the Tomb monument of Emperor Louis IV in the Munich Frauenkirche. His main work, the church of the minims in Munich was demolished in 1902.

Gallery 

1634 deaths
Architects of the Bavarian court
16th-century German architects
Renaissance architects
Year of birth uncertain
16th-century German sculptors
German male sculptors
17th-century German sculptors
17th-century German architects
People from Weilheim-Schongau